Kaempferol 7-O-glucoside is a flavonol glucoside. It can be found in Smilax china, and in the fern Asplenium rhizophyllum, and its hybrid descendants, as part of a complex with caffeic acid.

Derivatives 
Amurensin is the tert-amyl alcohol derivative of kaempferol 7-O-glucoside. [[6'-O-acetyl amurensin|6''-O-acetyl amurensin]] is found in the leaves of Phellodendron japonicum''.

References 

Kaempferol glycosides
Flavonol glucosides